Fergus Hamilton Allen CB FRSL (3 September 1921 – 22 July 2017) was a civil servant and author.

Allen was educated at Newtown School, Waterford before going up to Trinity College, Dublin (MA, MAI, ScD).

References

External links 
Debrett's People of Today
Profile and poem at The Poetry Archive

1921 births
2017 deaths
Alumni of Trinity College Dublin
Fellows of the Royal Society of Literature
Companions of the Order of the Bath